Time for Terry was an Australian TV series which ran in from 1964–1966. It was a variety show that was hosted by English comedian and entertainer as well as jazz musician Terry O'Neill. The show was a forerunner to such shows as The Midday Show and Hey Hey It's Saturday, combining variety and music with game show elements. The show was so successful for HSV7 that it launched a season of Night-time for Terry in 1966. O'Neill had run a similar successful show in England called The One O'Clock Show. Amongst other highlights, the show was responsible for launching the careers of Pat Carroll and Olivia Newton-John, whose farewell to Australian television before leaving for England was broadcast on the show. Terry's then wife Peggy Haig (sister of English comic actor Jack Haig) made frequent appearances as did their daughter Coral Kelly - later to become prolific television writer Coral Drouyn.

Cast
 Vi Greenhalf
 Joe Hudson
 Ivan Hutchinson
 Brian Naylor
 Olivia Newton-John
 Ian Turpie

References

External links
 

1960s Australian game shows
1965 Australian television series debuts
1965 Australian television series endings